John W. Goedde (born May 20, 1949) was born in Chelan, Washington. He was a member of the Idaho Senate from 2002-2014 representing District 4, he previously served in District 3 from 2000-2002. He is married to Terri and is a father to two: Brian and Melissa (deceased) and one stepson.

Education and career 
Goedde attended Washington State University and received his BA in 1972. From 1973 to 1979, he was manager of Hayden Lake Country Club. From 1979 to 1983, he was an agent at Panhandle Insurance and Realty. He has been President of Panhandle Insurance Agency since 1983.

In 1997, Goedde was School Board Trustee at Coeur d'Alene School District #271 for three years.

In May 2014 John Goedde was defeated in the Republican primary to Mary Souza only getting 46.1% of the vote.

Education Committee
As the chair of the Education Committee of the Idaho Senate, Goedde introduced legislation in February 2013 that would require all Idaho high school students to read objectivist Ayn Rand's Atlas Shrugged. Students would also be required to pass an exam on the book in order to graduate. When asked why he chose that particular book, Goedde explained, "[t]hat book made my son a Republican." Goedde said that he didn't intend to schedule a hearing for the bill, which he referred to as a "shot across the bow" of the Idaho State Board of Education whose decisions he disagreed with.

Committees 
He is a member of:
 Commerce and Human Resources
 Chairman of Education
 Commissioner of Education Commission of the States
 Vice Chairman of National Conference of State Legislatures Education Committee
 Board of Directors of State Insurance Fund 2001-2014
 State Board of Education Oversight Accountability - retired 2021
 IPRAC
 Co-Chairman of Economic Outlook and Revenue Assessment
 Director of State Insurance Fund since 2001
 Co-Chairman of Inland Pacific Hub Committee
 Idaho Digital Learning Academy Task Force 2010 - 2014.

Awards 
 Ed Abbott Award Winner

References

External links
 Goedde on Vote Smart
 Official website
 Idaho Legislature

1949 births
Living people
Republican Party Idaho state senators
People from Chelan, Washington
School board members in Idaho
Washington State University alumni